Cardile is a southern Italian village and the only hamlet (frazione) of Gioi, a municipality in the province of Salerno, Campania. As of 2009 its population was of 614.

History
The village was founded in the 11th century, around an ancient Lavra Basiliana named "La Laura". In 1754 the village was divided into 3 wards: Piedicardile, in the lower side;  Mezzocardile, in the middle; and Capocardile, in the upper side.

Geography
Cardile is located in the middle of Cilento, and is part of its national park. It is a hillside village that lies below the mountains Velosa (943 m) and Tempa del Bosco (908 m), both part of the Southern Apennines.

The village is 6 km from Gioi, 5 from Moio della Civitella, 8 from Vallo della Lucania, 11 from Stio, and 23 from the Ancient Greek town of Velia. Other nearby villages are Pellare (6 km), and Angellara (7 km). A few km south of the village, there are the springs of the Fiumarella, a tributary creek of the river Alento.

Main sights
Some of the sights of Cardile are:
The Church of St. John the Baptist
The Baronial Building
The waterfalls of Fiumarella and the nearby nature trails

Personalities
Riccio Brothers, involved in the Rebellions of Cilento of 1828

See also
Cilentan dialect
Cilento and Vallo di Diano National Park

References

External links

 Cardile official website
Genetic Park of Cilento and Vallo di Diano Project (Campora, Gioi, Cardile)

Frazioni of the Province of Salerno
Localities of Cilento